The Ruhuhu River is a river in Ruvuma Region, Tanzania.

Geography
The source of the Ruhuhu is on the eastern slope of the Kipengere Range (Livingstone Mountains) in Tanzania, where it first flows southeast and then turns west to Lake Nyasa (Lake Malawi). The river's mouth is just south of Manda.

Catchment area
As the longest river flowing into Lake Malawi, by convention it is the headwaters of the Shire, which drains the lake. The Ruhuhu carries water all year round.

Hydrometry
However the values ​​in other sources are higher by a factor of about four.

References 

Rivers of Tanzania
Geography of Ruvuma Region